This is a list of British television related events from 1961.

Events

January
1 January – Dechrau Canu, Dechrau Canmol, featuring congregational Christian singing in the Welsh language, debuts on BBC Television. The series will still be on the air, now being broadcast on S4C, 60 years later.
5 January – The American family cartoon series The Flintstones debuts in the ITV London region.  Other regions begin broadcasting the popular show later, with ITV North on 31st August.
7 January – The Avengers premieres on ITV.

February
3 February – The final live episode of Coronation Street is aired. From now on all episodes are prerecorded. The next live transmission will not occur until 8 December 2000.

March
6 March – Coronation Street begins airing on Monday and Wednesday evenings at 7:30pm. Previously, it had been transmitted on Wednesday and Friday evenings at 7pm. (see scheduling of Coronation Street)
March – An edition of ABC's Sunday evening religious programme The Sunday Break features a performance of the controversial Passion Play "A Man Dies", depicting Jesus Christ dressed in a pair of jeans.

April
4 April – Southern launches a weeknight 30-minute regional news programme called Day By Day.
29 April – Westward Television, the first ITV franchise for South West England, goes on air.

May
No events.

June
9 June – The Radio Ham episode of Hancock first transmitted on BBC TV.
23 June – The Blood Donor episode of Hancock first transmitted on BBC TV.

July
No events.

August
No events.

September
1 September – Border Television, the ITV franchise for the English-Scottish Border and Isle of Man, goes on air.
30 September – Grampian Television, the ITV franchise for North East Scotland, goes on air.

October
1 October – Songs of Praise, featuring Christian congregations singing hymns, debuts on BBC Television, the first programme being hosted by Tabernacle Chapel, Cardiff. The series will still be on the air 60 years later.
2 October – Points of View, featuring the letters of viewers offering praise, criticism and comments on the television of recent weeks, debuts on BBC Television. The series will still be on the air 60 years later.

November
No events.

December
15 December – The BBC broadcasts the first Comedy Playhouse. The series broadcasts a series of one-off unrelated sitcoms. Over the next 14 years the series would air the pilot episodes of many popular comedies, including  Steptoe and Son, Till Death Us Do Part, Up Pompeii!, The Liver Birds, Are You Being Served? and Last of the Summer Wine.

Unknown
 Southern Television launches the UK's first localised news opt-out when it launches a news service for south east England from its new studios in Dover.

Debuts

BBC Television Service/BBC TV
15 January – Paradise Walk (1961)
27 January – The House Under the Water (1961)
February – The Valiant Years (1961)
3 March – Rashomon (1961)
25 March – Ask Mr. Pastry (1961)
4 April – They Met in a City (1961)
9 April – Rob Roy (1961)
14 April – Amelia (1961)
30 April – Ask Anne (1961)
18 May – Court of Mystery (1961)
4 June – Triton (1961)
16 June – Magnolia Street (1961)
7 June – Moody In...  (1961)
20 June – Walk a Crooked Mile (1961)
2 July – Hurricane (1961)
28 July – Storyboard (1961)
1 August –Our Mister Ambler (1961)
14 September – The Randy Dandy (1961)
24 September – Stranger on the Shore (1961)
1 October – Songs of Praise (1961–present)
2 October – Points of View (1961–present)
3 October – A for Andromeda (1961)
5 October – You Can't Win (1961)
6 October – The Rag Trade (1961–1963, 1977–1978)
20 October – Dr. Kildare (1961–1966)
3 November – Anna Karenina (1961)
4 November – Gamble for a Throne (1961)
16 November – 
The Seven Faces of Jim (1961–1963)
Jacks and Knaves (1961)
19 November – The Charlie Chester Music Hall (1961–1962)
21 November – The Escape of R.D.7 (1961)
22 November – A Chance of Thunder (1961)
3 December – Vice Versa: A Lesson to Fathers (1961)
10 December – Gilbert and Sullivan (1961)
15 December – 
Comedy Playhouse (1961–1974)
Where the Difference Begins (1961)

ITV
5 January – The Flintstones (1960–1966)
7 January – The Avengers (1961–1969)
17 January – The Blackness (1961)
25 January – Jango (1961)
28 January – Supercar (1961–1962)
29 January – The Mask of the Clown (1961)
1 February – Survival (1961–2001)
12 February – Happily Ever After (1961–1964)
5 March – Pathfinders to Venus (1961)
11 March – The Arthur Askey Show (1961)
14 March – A Brother for Joe (1961)
19 March – Drama 61-67 (1961–1967)
29 March – Tales of Mystery (1961–1963)
1 April – Thank Your Lucky Stars (1961–1966)
8 April – Bonanza (1959–1973)
29 April – If the Crown Fits (1961)
30 April – The Secret of the Nubian Tomb (1961)
15 May – Three Live Wires (1961)
26 June – Harpers West One (1961–1963)
28 June – Family Solicitor (1961)
11 August – Top Secret (1961–1962)
24 August – Echo Four Two (1961)
9 September 
 Ghost Squad (1961–1964)
 The Jo Stafford Show (1961)
 Winning Widows (1961–1962)
11 September – Home Tonight (1961)
12 September – Tuesday Rendezvous (1961–1963)
14 September – Hamlet (1961)
15 September – Colonel Trumper's Private War (1961)
22 September – Frontier Drums (1961)
24 September – Plateau of Fear (1961)
24 September – Call Oxbridge 2000 (1961–1962)
12 October – Two of a Kind (1961–1968)
31 October – Thirty Minute Theatre (1961–1965)
12 November – Sir Francis Drake (1961–1962)
24 December – Journey of a Lifetime (1961–1962)
Unknown – 
One Step Beyond (1959–1961)
The Pursuers (1961–1962)
Tempo (1961–1968)

Continuing television shows

1920s
BBC Wimbledon (1927–1939, 1946–2019, 2021–2024)

1930s
The Boat Race (1938–1939, 1946–2019)
BBC Cricket (1939, 1946–1999, 2020–2024)

1940s
Come Dancing (1949–1998)

1950s
Andy Pandy (1950–1970, 2002–2005)
Watch with Mother (1952–1975) 
Rag, Tag and Bobtail (1953–1965)
The Good Old Days (1953–1983)
Panorama (1953–present)
Picture Book (1955–1965)
Sunday Night at the London Palladium (1955–1967, 1973–1974)
Take Your Pick! (1955–1968, 1992–1998)
Double Your Money (1955–1968)
Dixon of Dock Green (1955–1976)
Crackerjack (1955–1984, 2020–present)
Opportunity Knocks (1956–1978, 1987–1990)
This Week (1956–1978, 1986–1992)
Armchair Theatre (1956–1974)
What the Papers Say (1956–2008)
The Sky at Night (1957–present)
Blue Peter (1958–present)
Grandstand (1958–2007)
Face to Face (1959–1962)
Noggin the Nog (1959–1965, 1970, 1979–1982)

1960s
Sykes and A... (1960–1965)
The Flintstones (1960–1966)
Coronation Street (1960–present)
Mess Mates (1960–1962)

Ending this year
 All Your Own (1952–1961)
 Hancock's Half Hour (1956–1961)
 The Army Game (1957–1961)
 Danger Man (1960–1961, 1964–1968)
 Saturday Playhouse (1958–1961)
 Deadline Midnight (1960–1961) 
 Torchy the Battery Boy (1960–1961) 
 The Jo Stafford Show (1961)

Births
 1 January 
Fiona Phillips, journalist, broadcaster and television presenter
Mark Wingett, British actor
 12 January – Simon Russell Beale, British actor
26 January – Mark Urban, journalist and author
 20 February – Imogen Stubbs, British actress
 21 February – Ross King, television presenter, actor and author
 10 April – Nicky Campbell, radio and television presenter
 14 April – Robert Carlyle, Scottish actor
 18 April – Jane Leeves, English actress
 20 April 
 Nicholas Lyndhurst, actor
 Paul Usher, actor
 2 May – Phil Vickery, British celebrity chef
 6 May – Pippa Haywood, English actress
 14 May – Tim Roth, English actor
 30 May – Harry Enfield, English comedian
 24 June – Iain Glen, Scottish actor
 25 June – Ricky Gervais, English comedian
 27 June – Meera Syal, British comedian and writer
 5 July – Gareth Jones, television presenter
 17 July – Jeremy Hardy, English comedian, radio panelist and singer (died 2019)
 5 August – Janet McTeer, British actress
 7 August – Brian Conley, comedian, television presenter, singer and actor
 16 August – Saskia Reeves, British actress
 18 August – Huw Edwards, journalist and news presenter
 27 August – Mark Curry, television presenter
 15 September – Colin McFarlane, actor and voice actor
 24 September – Jack Dee, actor and comedian 
 7 October – Simon McCoy, BBC newsreader
 10 October – Martin Kemp, musician and actor
 11 October – Neil Buchanan, artist, presenter and musician
 26 October – Linda Barker, interior designer and television presenter
 27 October – Joanna Scanlan, actress and television writer
 9 November – Jill Dando, television newsreader (died 1999)
 27 November – Samantha Bond, British actress
 28 November – Martin Clunes, actor
 11 December – Marco Pierre White, British chef and restaurateur
 12 December – Sarah Sutton, British actress
 19 December – Matthew Waterhouse, British actor
 23 December – Carol Smillie, television presenter

Deaths
28 September – Michael Shepley, actor, aged 53
12 October – Jack Livesey, actor, aged 60

See also
 1961 in British music
 1961 in British radio
 1961 in the United Kingdom
 List of British films of 1961

References